Jay H. Gordon (October 10, 1930 – December 4, 2007) was a Vermont Democratic politician who served as Auditor of Accounts from 1965 until 1969.

Gordon was born in 1930 in Bellows Falls, Vermont. He attended the Dean Academy in Massachusetts and later graduated from the University of Vermont in 1953. He subsequently earned his master's degree from New York University in 1959.

While studying for his master's degree, Gordon worked as an auditor at Peat, Marwick Mitchell and Company. He was later a partner with Bliss, Lawlor and Company from 1959 to 1965.

In 1964, he married his wife, Joan, in Massachusetts. They had two sons.

Gordon then served as Vermont's Auditor from 1965 until 1969 under the administration of Governor Philip Hoff.

Following his service as state auditor, Gordon served as a partner with the Jay H. Gordon accounting firm from 1970 until 1987. In 1987, he joined Smith, Batchelder and Rugg. In 1990, he became a professor of accounting at Norwich University until his retirement in 2001.

During the Korean War, he served in the Air Force as a First Lieutenant.

Gordon died along with his wife, Joan, on December 4, 2007, after a fire engulfed their home in Montpelier. He was 77. The official cause of death was smoke inhalation.

References

1930 births
2007 deaths
State Auditors of Vermont
Deaths by smoke inhalation
University of Vermont alumni
New York University alumni
People from Bellows Falls, Vermont
Military personnel from Vermont
Vermont Democrats
20th-century American politicians
Accidental deaths in Vermont